Veshgan may refer to:
 Veshgan, Markazi